Cove Bay, known locally as Cove, is a suburb on the south-east edge of Aberdeen, Scotland.

Today Cove is home to around 8,000 people. It is a popular residential location owing to its village-like status. It is a quiet suburb at the Southern edge of Aberdeen City and in 2015 won the Silver award for Scotland in bloom. Altens and Tullos Industrial Estates offer nearby employment opportunities. There is also easy access to the new AWPR A90.

History

Cove Bay is situated to the east of the ancient Causey Mounth, which road was built on high ground to make passable this only available medieval route from coastal points south from Stonehaven to Aberdeen. This ancient trackway specifically connected the River Dee crossing (where the Bridge of Dee is located) via Portlethen Moss, Muchalls Castle and Stonehaven to the south. The route was that taken by William Keith, 7th Earl Marischal and the Marquess of Montrose, who led a Covenanter army of 9000 men in the battle of the Civil War in 1639.

Historically in the extreme north-east corner of Kincardineshire, until 1975 it was governed from the county town of Stonehaven, when it was added to the City of Aberdeen. Though simply referred to as Cove, in the 19th and early 20th centuries it was known as The Cove, becoming Cove Bay around 1912.

Cove Bay railway station opened in 1850 and operated until 1956 for passengers and 1964 for goods. The line remains in use and is now part of the Dundee–Aberdeen line.

Industry

Cove has been noted for industries such as granite, which was quarried in several locations to the south of the village. Owing to its close-grained texture, Cove granite was one of the hardest in north-east Scotland and proved highly resistant to frost, making it ideal for causeway stones used in the construction of roads. It was widely exported to cities in England, including Billingsgate Market in London.

Fishing

The village itself sprung up around the fishing industry, with the boats berthed on a shingle beach, a gap in the rocks that afforded a natural harbour. During this time, it is estimated that approximately 300 people lived in the area. In the mid 19th century the fishing was at its height, which, over years, has included cod, haddock, salmon, herring and shellfish. The piers and breakwater were constructed in 1878. At the end of World War I the fishing began to decline. At present only a couple of boats pursue shellfish on a part-time basis.

Between 1894 and 1937, Cove also housed a fishmeal factory, the Aberdeen Fish Meal Factory, which was located at the edge of the cliffs. It produced quality manure which was exported to both Europe and America. It became locally known as "the stinker" because of the processing odour, which was highlighted by the Aberdeen entertainer Harry Gordon in a parody entitled A Song of Cove.

Amenities

Retail

Cove has a Co-operative on the corner of Earn's Heugh Road and Loirston Avenue.
There is also a RS McColl newsagent located at Bervie Brow in Altens, and a Premier Express And Postoffice located on the corner of Loirston Road and Cove Road.

To the west of Loirston Avenue is the Cove Shopping Centre, which overlooks Loirston Primary School and the local library. This houses a pharmacist, Wee China Takeaway, The Cupcake Stop, Carnie & Poole hairdresser and Corals Bookmakers.

Within the newer Charleston development of Cove there are several shops. A local Sainsbury's, a hairdressers/beautician (I-Candy), gift shop (Luxe), barbershop (The Cleavin Barber Club), butcher (Meet the Meat), tanning salon (Tan Allure) and a martial arts studio (Aberdeen Martial Arts Group).

Hospitality

The Cove Bay hotel is located on Colsea Road. There is also The Aberdeen Altens Hotel in Altens, which has 216 bedrooms.

There is also a pub, the Langdykes which hosts all live sport and promotes live music every Saturday evening.

Transport

A bus service to and from Cove and the wider area of Aberdeen is available. This is run by First Aberdeen with the numbers 3 and 3A.

Healthcare

Cove Bay has its own medical centre which also has an NHS dental practice, the Cove Bay Medical Centre. Originally located on Catto Walk, moved to a new facility accessed from Earns Heugh Road. Bupa Dental Care Cove Bay has since moved into the old surgery building on Catto Walk.

Sport

There is a new Balmoral Stadium in Cove located beside Wellington Circe that replaced the now demolished Allan Park.
Cove is currently home to two football teams: Cove Rangers, who currently play in the Scottish League One and Cove Thistle, who hold amateur status. Sunday amateur team Cove Revolution folded in 2010. There are also many youth teams in the area that are run by Cove Youth FC. The Cove Youth FC area SFA credited community club, organizing players from 6 years old up to 19 years old. They also have a girls section. The Cove Community Football Trust is run by Cove Rangers FC, Cove Thistle FC and Cove Youth FC.

Other Amenities

A state-of-the-art library was recently built between Loirston Primary School and the Cove Shopping Centre.

Education

Cove has two primary schools, Charleston Primary School and Loirston Primary School. Most secondary pupils attend the nearby Lochside Academy, but some choose to go to Portlethen Academy.

Future developments

Aberdeen Gateway

Construction on a new Aberdeen Gateway industrial development began in 2008. New offices and industrial units have been built to the south of the village. Current tenants at the site include well decommissioning specialists Well-Safe Solutions, National Oilwell Varco (NOV), Driving Standards Agency and Hydrasun. A community football pitch is also included within the development.

See also
Banchory-Devenick
Hare Ness
Nigg

References

Further reading

External links
 www.cove-bay.com - website

Areas of Aberdeen